Princess Air was a British charter airline between 1989 and 1991 with headquarters at Southend-on-Sea in Essex and an operating base at Southend Airport.

History
Formed by a local tour operator Burstin Travel, the company started operations in 1990 using a quick change (passenger/freighter) variant of the BAe 146-200. It operated charter flights from Southend and Bournemouth Airport to holiday destinations in Europe. At night the aircraft operated freight flights between Cologne and Brussels.

Due to the economic situation the airline ceased operation in February 1991.

One of the fleet is shown landing and taxiing in episode 5 of series 6 of the TV series Howards' Way.

Fleet
 BAe 146 (94 seats)

See also
 List of defunct airlines of the United Kingdom

References

External links

Defunct airlines of the United Kingdom
Airlines established in 1989
Airlines disestablished in 1991